The Mid State Conference  was a high school conference in central Illinois. The conference participated in athletics and activities in the Illinois High School Association. The conference comprised 15 small public high schools, with enrollments between 60-340 students in Iroquois, LaSalle, Livingston, McLean, Tazewell, and Woodford counties.

History 
The first year of competition for the Mid State was 1949 with eight charter schools: Chenoa, Cornell, El Paso, Fairbury, Flanagan, Gridley, Lexington and Minonk-Dana. In 1951, Fairbury merged with Cropsey High School and remained in the conference as Fairbury-Cropsey High School. Additionally, in 1955, Minonk-Dana consolidated with Rutland High School, again, maintaining a league with eight school. Unfortunately, in 1957, Fairbury-Cropsey left for the short-lived United Conference. For seven years the conference maintained seven schools, however in 1964, Streator Woodland joined the league. Cornell dropped football in 1971, but Deer Creek-Mackinaw was added in 1972 to round out the league again with eight. Gridley dropped football briefly in 1984, but resumed the program in 1986. Cornell would consolidate their enrollment into Flanagan High School in 1987, reducing the number of schools to seven, again. In 1992, Minonk-Dana-Rutland consolidated with a neighboring districts Toluca, and Wenona to become known as Fieldcrest, but remained in the Mid State.

For over 40 years the Mid State Conference maintained seven or eight schools with very few exceptions, however in 1995, Cullom Tri-Point and Tremont joined the league taking the total to 10. Additionally, Colfax Ridgeview and Heyworth would join in 1997, taking the total number of schools to 12. The league would remain at 12 until 2004 when El Paso and Gridley consolidated and Chenoa High School consolidated with Prairie Central. Prairie Central already included a former league member, Fairbury-Cropsey, who in 1985 consolidated with Forrest-Strawn-Wing High School and Chatsworth High Schools.

In the early 2000s, talks began to join forces with the Sangamon Valley Conference in order to create a league with divisions based on enrollment. This conference would be known as the Heart of Illinois and was formed in 2006, thus ending the 56 year old run for the Mid State.

All-time membership

Sources:IHSA Conferences, and IHSA Member Schools Directory A History of Minonk Schools

Membership timeline 

 ''Sources:Illinois High School Glory Days,

References

External links
 Flanagan-Cornell High School
 El Paso-Gridley High School
 Prairie Central High School
 Lexington High School
 Fieldcrest High School
 Woodland High School
 Deer-Creek Mackinaw High School
 Tri-Point High School
 Tremont High School
 Ridgeview High School
 Heyworth High School

High school sports in Illinois
Illinois high school sports conferences